Heiko (2008) is a Portuguese short film, directed by David Bonneville and produced by the Calouste Gulbenkian Foundation. It is 13 minutes long.

The film shows the perverse relationship between a 70-year-old aesthete and a young man named Heiko.

It is part of the DVD compilation 'Boys on Film 4: Protect Me From What I Want' distributed by Peccadillo Pictures.

Cast
José Manuel Mendes
Jaime Freitas

Festival Highlights
Heiko had many awards
Best Short Film Award at the 24th MixCopenhagen International Film Festival (winner)
Special Mention at the 10th Slamdance Film Festival, Park City, Utah, US (winner)
IndieLisboa Lisbon International Film Festival (nomination) 
RUSHES Soho Shorts Film Festival, UK (nomination)
Toronto InsideOut Film Festival, Canada (nomination)
Torino G&L Film Festival (nomination)
TIFF Transilvania International Film Festival

External links 

Heiko on the director's website

References 

2008 films
2000s Portuguese-language films
Portuguese short films
2008 short films
Gay-related films